Crassispira guayana is an extinct species of sea snail, a marine gastropod mollusk in the family Pseudomelatomidae, the turrids and allies. Fossils have been found in Pliocene and Pleistocene strata in Ecuador; age range: 5.332 to 2.588 Ma.

References

 H. A. Pilsbry and A.A. Olsson. 1941. A Pliocene fauna from Western Ecuador. Proceedings of the Natural Sciences of Philadelphia 93:1-79

guayana
Gastropods described in 1941